Sherry Lynn Smith (born 1951) is an American historian, and  University Distinguished Professor at Southern Methodist University.
From 2008 to 2009, she was President of the Western History Association.

Works

References 

1951 births
Southern Methodist University faculty
Living people